The 1966–67 New York Rangers season was the franchise's 41st season. In the regular season, the Rangers finished in fourth place in the NHL with 72 points and qualified for the playoffs. New York lost in the NHL semi-finals to the Montreal Canadiens in a four-game sweep.

Regular season

Final standings

Record vs. opponents

Schedule and results

|- align="center" bgcolor="#FFBBBB"
| 1 || 19 || Chicago Black Hawks || 6–3 || 0–1–0
|- align="center" bgcolor="white"
| 2 || 22 || @ Toronto Maple Leafs || 4–4 || 0–1–1
|- align="center" bgcolor="#CCFFCC"
| 3 || 23 || Toronto Maple Leafs || 1–0 || 1–1–1
|- align="center" bgcolor="#FFBBBB"
| 4 || 27 || @ Detroit Red Wings || 5–3 || 1–2–1
|- align="center" bgcolor="#FFBBBB"
| 5 || 29 || @ Montreal Canadiens || 3–0 || 1–3–1
|-

|- align="center" bgcolor="#CCFFCC"
| 6 || 3 || @ Boston Bruins || 7–1 || 2–3–1
|- align="center" bgcolor="#FFBBBB"
| 7 || 5 || @ Toronto Maple Leafs || 3–1 || 2–4–1
|- align="center" bgcolor="white"
| 8 || 6 || Toronto Maple Leafs || 3–3 || 2–4–2
|- align="center" bgcolor="#FFBBBB"
| 9 || 8 || @ Chicago Black Hawks || 3–1 || 2–5–2
|- align="center" bgcolor="white"
| 10 || 9 || Boston Bruins || 3–3 || 2–5–3
|- align="center" bgcolor="#CCFFCC"
| 11 || 12 || @ Montreal Canadiens || 6–3 || 3–5–3
|- align="center" bgcolor="#CCFFCC"
| 12 || 13 || Detroit Red Wings || 5–2 || 4–5–3
|- align="center" bgcolor="white"
| 13 || 16 || Chicago Black Hawks || 2–2 || 4–5–4
|- align="center" bgcolor="white"
| 14 || 19 || @ Boston Bruins || 3–3 || 4–5–5
|- align="center" bgcolor="#FFBBBB"
| 15 || 20 || Montreal Canadiens || 2–1 || 4–6–5
|- align="center" bgcolor="#CCFFCC"
| 16 || 23 || Boston Bruins || 5–4 || 5–6–5
|- align="center" bgcolor="#CCFFCC"
| 17 || 26 || Chicago Black Hawks || 4–1 || 6–6–5
|- align="center" bgcolor="#CCFFCC"
| 18 || 27 || Toronto Maple Leafs || 5–0 || 7–6–5
|- align="center" bgcolor="#CCFFCC"
| 19 || 30 || @ Chicago Black Hawks || 5–0 || 8–6–5
|-

|- align="center" bgcolor="white"
| 20 || 3 || @ Boston Bruins || 2–2 || 8–6–6
|- align="center" bgcolor="#FFBBBB"
| 21 || 4 || Montreal Canadiens || 3–1 || 8–7–6
|- align="center" bgcolor="#CCFFCC"
| 22 || 7 || Boston Bruins || 4–2 || 9–7–6
|- align="center" bgcolor="#CCFFCC"
| 23 || 8 || @ Detroit Red Wings || 4–2 || 10–7–6
|- align="center" bgcolor="#CCFFCC"
| 24 || 11 || Montreal Canadiens || 4–2 || 11–7–6
|- align="center" bgcolor="#CCFFCC"
| 25 || 14 || Detroit Red Wings || 4–1 || 12–7–6
|- align="center" bgcolor="#CCFFCC"
| 26 || 17 || @ Toronto Maple Leafs || 3–1 || 13–7–6
|- align="center" bgcolor="#FFBBBB"
| 27 || 18 || @ Detroit Red Wings || 5–0 || 13–8–6
|- align="center" bgcolor="#CCFFCC"
| 28 || 21 || Boston Bruins || 5–1 || 14–8–6
|- align="center" bgcolor="#CCFFCC"
| 29 || 24 || @ Montreal Canadiens || 4–3 || 15–8–6
|- align="center" bgcolor="#CCFFCC"
| 30 || 25 || @ Chicago Black Hawks || 1–0 || 16–8–6
|- align="center" bgcolor="#FFBBBB"
| 31 || 27 || Chicago Black Hawks || 3–2 || 16–9–6
|- align="center" bgcolor="#CCFFCC"
| 32 || 29 || Detroit Red Wings || 4–2 || 17–9–6
|- align="center" bgcolor="#FFBBBB"
| 33 || 31 || @ Montreal Canadiens || 3–0 || 17–10–6
|-

|- align="center" bgcolor="#FFBBBB"
| 34 || 1 || Toronto Maple Leafs || 2–1 || 17–11–6
|- align="center" bgcolor="white"
| 35 || 4 || @ Toronto Maple Leafs || 1–1 || 17–11–7
|- align="center" bgcolor="#CCFFCC"
| 36 || 8 || Montreal Canadiens || 2–1 || 18–11–7
|- align="center" bgcolor="#CCFFCC"
| 37 || 12 || @ Boston Bruins || 3–0 || 19–11–7
|- align="center" bgcolor="#FFBBBB"
| 38 || 14 || @ Chicago Black Hawks || 5–3 || 19–12–7
|- align="center" bgcolor="#CCFFCC"
| 39 || 15 || @ Detroit Red Wings || 2–0 || 20–12–7
|- align="center" bgcolor="#FFBBBB"
| 40 || 21 || @ Boston Bruins || 6–2 || 20–13–7
|- align="center" bgcolor="#FFBBBB"
| 41 || 22 || @ Detroit Red Wings || 7–2 || 20–14–7
|- align="center" bgcolor="#CCFFCC"
| 42 || 25 || Boston Bruins || 2–1 || 21–14–7
|- align="center" bgcolor="#FFBBBB"
| 43 || 28 || @ Montreal Canadiens || 3–2 || 21–15–7
|- align="center" bgcolor="#FFBBBB"
| 44 || 29 || Detroit Red Wings || 4–2 || 21–16–7
|-

|- align="center" bgcolor="#CCFFCC"
| 45 || 4 || @ Boston Bruins || 4–3 || 22–16–7
|- align="center" bgcolor="#CCFFCC"
| 46 || 5 || Toronto Maple Leafs || 4–1 || 23–16–7
|- align="center" bgcolor="#FFBBBB"
| 47 || 8 || Boston Bruins || 2–1 || 23–17–7
|- align="center" bgcolor="#FFBBBB"
| 48 || 11 || @ Detroit Red Wings || 6–3 || 23–18–7
|- align="center" bgcolor="white"
| 49 || 12 || Montreal Canadiens || 4–4 || 23–18–8
|- align="center" bgcolor="#FFBBBB"
| 50 || 15 || @ Toronto Maple Leafs || 6–0 || 23–19–8
|- align="center" bgcolor="#CCFFCC"
| 51 || 18 || Chicago Black Hawks || 4–1 || 24–19–8
|- align="center" bgcolor="#CCFFCC"
| 52 || 19 || @ Chicago Black Hawks || 3–2 || 25–19–8
|- align="center" bgcolor="#CCFFCC"
| 53 || 22 || Detroit Red Wings || 1–0 || 26–19–8
|- align="center" bgcolor="#CCFFCC"
| 54 || 25 || @ Montreal Canadiens || 5–0 || 27–19–8
|- align="center" bgcolor="#FFBBBB"
| 55 || 26 || Toronto Maple Leafs || 4–2 || 27–20–8
|-

|- align="center" bgcolor="#FFBBBB"
| 56 || 1 || @ Chicago Black Hawks || 6–1 || 27–21–8
|- align="center" bgcolor="white"
| 57 || 4 || @ Boston Bruins || 4–4 || 27–21–9
|- align="center" bgcolor="#FFBBBB"
| 58 || 5 || Montreal Canadiens || 2–0 || 27–22–9
|- align="center" bgcolor="#FFBBBB"
| 59 || 8 || Detroit Red Wings || 3–1 || 27–23–9
|- align="center" bgcolor="white"
| 60 || 11 || @ Toronto Maple Leafs || 2–2 || 27–23–10
|- align="center" bgcolor="white"
| 61 || 12 || Montreal Canadiens || 2–2 || 27–23–11
|- align="center" bgcolor="#FFBBBB"
| 62 || 15 || Chicago Black Hawks || 3–1 || 27–24–11
|- align="center" bgcolor="#FFBBBB"
| 63 || 18 || @ Montreal Canadiens || 4–2 || 27–25–11
|- align="center" bgcolor="#CCFFCC"
| 64 || 19 || Boston Bruins || 3–1 || 28–25–11
|- align="center" bgcolor="white"
| 65 || 22 || @ Chicago Black Hawks || 3–3 || 28–25–12
|- align="center" bgcolor="#FFBBBB"
| 66 || 23 || @ Detroit Red Wings || 4–1 || 28–26–12
|- align="center" bgcolor="#CCFFCC"
| 67 || 26 || Toronto Maple Leafs || 4–0 || 29–26–12
|- align="center" bgcolor="#CCFFCC"
| 68 || 29 || Detroit Red Wings || 10–5 || 30–26–12
|-

|- align="center" bgcolor="#FFBBBB"
| 69 || 1 || @ Toronto Maple Leafs || 5–1 || 30–27–12
|- align="center" bgcolor="#FFBBBB"
| 70 || 2 || Chicago Black Hawks || 8–0 || 30–28–12
|-

Playoffs

Key:  Win  Loss

Player statistics
Skaters

Goaltenders

†Denotes player spent time with another team before joining Rangers. Stats reflect time with Rangers only.
‡Traded mid-season. Stats reflect time with Rangers only.

Awards and records

Transactions

Draft picks
New York's picks at the 1966 NHL Amateur Draft in Montreal, Quebec, Canada.

Farm teams

See also
 1966–67 NHL season

References

New York Rangers seasons
New York Rangers
New York Rangers
New York Rangers
New York Rangers
Madison Square Garden
1960s in Manhattan